Titovsky is a rural locality (a khutor) in Ust-Buzulukskoye Rural Settlement, Alexeyevsky District, Volgograd Oblast, Russia. The population was 227 as of 2010.

Geography 
Titovsky is located on the right bank of the Khopyor River, 17 km southeast of Alexeyevskaya (the district's administrative centre) by road. Barminsky is the nearest rural locality.

References 

Rural localities in Alexeyevsky District, Volgograd Oblast